Neem oil, also known as margosa oil, is a vegetable oil pressed from the fruits and seeds of the neem (Azadirachta indica), a tree which is indigenous to the Indian subcontinent and has been introduced to many other areas in the tropics. It is the most important of the commercially available products of neem and is used for organic farming and medicines.

Composition 
Azadirachtin is the most well known and studied triterpenoid in neem oil. Nimbin is another triterpenoid which has been credited with some of neem oil's properties as an antiseptic, antifungal, antipyretic and antihistamine.

Uses

Ayurveda 
Neem oil has a history of use in Ayurveda folk medicine. There is limited evidence for its use in treating acute skin toxicity in head and neck cancer chemotherapy involving cisplatin.

Toxicity
The ingestion of neem oil is potentially toxic and can cause metabolic acidosis, seizures, kidney failure, encephalopathy and severe brain ischemia in infants and young children. Neem oil should not be consumed alone without any other solutions, particularly by pregnant women, women trying to conceive, or children. It can also be associated with allergic contact dermatitis.

Resins   
Recently, neem oil has been utilized to prepare various polymeric resins.  These resins are used to formulate different types of polyurethane coatings.

Pesticide 
Formulations made of neem oil also find wide usage as a biopesticide for horticulturists and for organic farming, as it repels a wide variety of pests including the mealy bug, beet armyworm, aphids, the cabbage worm, thrips, whiteflies, mites, fungus gnats, beetles, moth larvae, mushroom flies, leafminers, caterpillars, locust, nematodes and the Japanese beetle. Neem oil is not known to be harmful to mammals, birds, earthworms or some beneficial insects such as butterflies, honeybees and ladybugs if it is not concentrated directly into their area of habitat or on their food source. It can be used as a household pesticide for ant, bedbug, cockroach, housefly, sand fly, snail, termite and mosquitoes both as repellent and larvicide.

Neem extracts act as an antifeedant and block the action of the insect molting hormone ecdysone. Azadirachtin is the most active of these growth regulators (limonoids), occurring at 0.2–0.4 % in the seeds of the neem tree.

References 

Plant toxin insecticides
Vegetable oils